The men's 20 kilometres road run event at the 1986 World Junior Championships in Athletics was held in Athens, Greece, on 20 July.

Medalists

Results

Final
20 July

Participation
According to an unofficial count, 28 athletes from 19 countries participated in the event.

References

20 kilometres road run
Road running at the World Junior Championships in Athletics